Settlers Cabin Park is a  county park in Allegheny County, Pennsylvania, United States. It is a part of the county's 12,000 acre (49 km2) network of nine distinct parks.

Archaeologists from Carnegie Museum of Natural History helped identify the 1780s log house that gives the park its name. The themes of the 11 picnic groves are Indian names: Algonquin, Seneca, Apache, Tomahawk, etc.

Settlers Cabin has the most heavily used of the county's three wave pools. The location along the major route to the airport makes it accessible, and swimmers from Ohio and West Virginia can easily reach the site. An impressive diving platform adds to the attraction.

References

External links
 Settlers Cabin Park website

Parks in the Pittsburgh metropolitan area
Parks in Allegheny County, Pennsylvania
County parks in the United States